Harold Lucious McLinton (July 1, 1947 – October 31, 1980) was an American football player who played linebacker in the National Football League with the Washington Redskins from 1969 to 1978.

McLinton was drafted by the Redskins in the 1969 NFL Draft out of Southern University and A&M College in the sixth round.  He spent his entire 10-year career with the Redskins, playing in 127 games.  He was a key contributor on the 1972 NFC Championship team.  He finished his career with four interceptions and one touchdown.  McLinton died on October 31, 1980 at the age of 33 from complications resulting from massive injuries sustained after being struck by a passing vehicle on Interstate 295 in southeast Washington after stopping to help a stranger change a flat tire.  He was a 1966 graduate of Harper High School in Atlanta, GA and went on to attend Southern on a football scholarship.  He graduated May 1969 with a bachelor's degree in Marketing & Management.

References 

American football linebackers
Washington Redskins players
Southern Jaguars football players
1947 births
1980 deaths
Road incident deaths in Washington, D.C.